The yellowspotted sawtail, Prionurus maculatus, is a tang of the family Acanthuridae, found in the southwest Pacific Ocean.

References 

 
 Tony Ayling & Geoffrey Cox, Collins Guide to the Sea Fishes of New Zealand,  (William Collins Publishers Ltd, Auckland, New Zealand 1982) 

Prionurus
Fish described in 1887